AB Bofors is a former Swedish arms manufacturer which today is part of the British arms manufacturer BAE Systems. The name has been associated with the iron industry and artillery manufacturing for more than 350 years.

History
Located in Karlskoga, Sweden, the company originates from the hammer mill "Boofors", which was founded as a royal state-owned company in 1646 when P. L. Hosman was permitted to erect a forge at the site. The modern corporate structure was created in 1873 with the foundation of Aktiebolaget (AB) Bofors-Gullspång.

The Bofors Works was acquired by Johan Eberhard Geijer (1733–1796) in 1762. It was then acquired by the latter's brother, Emanuel af Geijerstam.

A leading Swedish steel producer by the early 1870s, when steel began to be used for gun manufacture in Sweden, Bofors initially sold cast and forged steel produced by the Siemens-Martin process to Finspång gun works, but soon started to expand into weapons manufacture. The company's first cannon workshop was opened in 1884. Bofors' most famous owner was Alfred Nobel, who owned the company from 1894 until his death in December 1896. Nobel played a key role in reshaping the former iron and steel producer to a modern cannon manufacturer and chemical industry participant. The powder manufacturer AB Bofors Nobelkrut, later an explosives and general organic-chemical producer, was created in 1898 as a wholly owned subsidiary.By 1911, AB Bofors-Gullspång had outcompeted, bought and closed down its Finspång Swedish competitor in cannon manufacture. The company's name was shortened to AB Bofors in 1919.

Karlskoga grew around the Bofors Works, which employed almost 10,000 people by 1970. The arms industry created numerous job opportunities in the 1900s, contributing to the population boom of the city.

Throughout its history, the works has been linked to several influential Swedish families such as Robsahm, Liljeström, Flygge, and Ekehjelm.

Present ownership

In 1999, Saab AB  purchased the Celsius Group, then the parent company of Bofors. In September 2000, United Defense Industries (UDI) of the United States acquired Bofors Weapons Systems (the heavy weapons division), while Saab retained the missile interests.

The British company BAE Systems acquired UDI and its Bofors subsidiary in 2005, and BAE Systems Bofors is now a business unit of the Swedish subdivision BAE Systems AB, while the Swedish unit Saab Bofors Dynamics is part of Saab AB.

Products 
 

The name Bofors is strongly associated with the Bofors 40 mm L/60 gun used by both sides during World War II. This automatic cannon is often simply called the Bofors gun and saw service on both land and sea. It became so widely known that anti-aircraft guns in general were often referred to as Bofors guns. Another well-known gun made by the company was the Bofors 37 mm Anti-Tank Gun L/45, a standard anti-tank weapon used by a variety of armies from the mid 1930s throughout World War II. It was built under licence in a variety of nations such as Finland, The Netherlands and Poland and used in a variety of tanks and armored vehicles, such as the Vickers 6-ton, M39 Pantserwagen and 7TP, among others.

Guns 
(incomplete list)
Bofors 20 mm Automatic Anti-Aircraft Gun L/70
Bofors 25 mm Automatic Gun L/64
Bofors 37 mm Anti-Tank Gun L/45
Bofors 40 mm Automatic Gun L/43
Bofors 40 mm Automatic Gun L/60
Bofors 40 mm Automatic Gun L/70
Bofors 57 mm Automatic Aircraft Gun L/50
Bofors 57 mm Naval Automatic Gun L/60
Bofors 57 mm Naval Automatic Gun L/70
Bofors 105 mm Coastal Automatic Gun L/54
Bofors 120 mm Automatic Anti-Aircraft Gun L/46
Bofors 120 mm Naval Automatic Gun L/50
Bofors 152 mm Naval Automatic Gun L/53
Bofors Tracked Automotive Gun 155 mm L/50
Bofors 155 mm Field Howitzer 77 A L/38
Bofors 155 mm Field Howitzer 77 B L/39
Bofors 155 mm Field Howitzer 77 BW L/39 L/52 (Archer)
Bofors 283 mm Naval Gun L/45

Missiles 
(incomplete list)
 BANTAM (Bofors Anti Tank Missile)
 BILL (Bofors Infantry Light and Lethal anti-tank missile)
 RBS 23
 RBS 70

Other weapons 
(incomplete list)
 Bofors 375 mm multi-barrel ASW rocket launcher
 Bofors HPM Blackout high-powered microwave weapon system

India scandal 

In 1986, the Government of India and Bofors signed a US$285 million contract for the supply of 410 155 mm field howitzers. The scandal contributed to the defeat of Rajiv Gandhi's government in the elections three years later.

See also
 Bofors Hotel
 The Bofors Gun – 1968 British drama film directed by Jack Gold, based on the play "Events While Guarding the Bofors Gun" by John McGrath
 List of modern armament manufacturers
 List of oldest companies

References

Citations

Works cited

External links

 BAE Systems Bofors
 Saab Bofors Dynamics
 http://nobelkarlskoga.se/welcome-2/bofors-industrial-museum/

 
Companies established in 1646
Companies established in 1873
Defence companies of Sweden
Defunct companies of Sweden
Karlskoga Municipality
BAE Systems subsidiaries and divisions
1646 establishments in Sweden